Rubondo Island National Park is one of two Tanzanian national parks located on an island in Lake Victoria (the other being Saanane Island National Park). The Island is administered by jurisdiction by the Geita District of Geita Region, and as a National Park, the island management is under TANAPA. The island attracts a small number of visitors each year, mainly game fishermen and bird enthusiasts.

Geography 
Rubondo Island is located in the south-western corner of Lake Victoria, Tanzania. The main island, Rubondo (2o 18’ S, 31o 50’ E) is 237 km2 in size. The island protects another 11 islets, none much larger than 2 km2. Lake Victoria is 1,134 metres above sea level. The highest point on Rubondo is the Masa Hills in the far south, at an elevation of 1,486m (350m above the level of the lake). The main island measures 28 km from north to south and is 3–10 km wide. Rubondo Island is on a rift in the lake. Rubondo essentially consists of a partially submerged rift of four volcanically formed hills, linked by three flatter isthmuses. The island has no rivers and the soil is volcanic. The habitat is mixed evergreen and semideciduous forest, which covers about 80% of the island’s surface area with common species including Croton sylvaticus, Drypetes gerrardii, and Lecaniodiscus fraxinifolius, and often with a dense understory of lianas, or woody vines. The forest is interspersed with patches of open grassland and, all but restricted to the Lukaya area, acacia woodland. The eastern lakeshore is characterised by rocky areas and sandy beaches whilst the western shore supports extensive papyrus swamps, lined with date palms.

Climate 
There is a bimodal rainfall distribution, with peaks in December and April–May during the October–May rainy season. The annual temperature is 19–26 0C.

History 

Rubondo Island became a game reserve in 1965, to provide a sanctuary for animals. Rubondo Island was gazetted as a national park in 1977. Today Rubondo is uninhabited. Consequently, 80% of the island remains forested today. The 400 “fisher folk” of the Zinza tribe, who lived on the island and maintained banana plantations, were resettled on neighbouring islands and onto the mainland by the government in the late 1960s. Courts have passed sentences of six weeks imprisonment for unauthorised landings on the island and six months for attempted poaching.

Animal introductions 

Over a four-year period (1966–1969) Professor Bernhard Grzimek of the Frankfurt Zoological Society (FZS) released 17 chimpanzees  in four cohorts onto Rubondo Island. The first cohort of chimpanzees arrived in Dar es Salaam aboard the German African Line’s steamship Eibe Oldendorff on 17 June 1966 (Standard Newspaper Tanzania, 1966). The animals had no rehabilitation or pre-release training. The chimpanzees were all wild-born and purportedly of West African descent, although there are no records of specific country of origin for the majority of released individuals. The founder chimpanzees had spent varying periods, from 3.5 months to 9 years, in captivity in European zoos or circuses before their release. The chimpanzees after one year were able to find and eat wild foods and construct nests for sleeping, and have now reverted to an unhabituated state characteristic of wild chimpanzees. From 16 founders the population has now grown to around 40 individuals (estimate based on nest counts).

In addition to chimpanzees, seven other species were introduced to the island: Roan antelope (Hippotragus equinus) and rhinoceros (Diceros bicornis) both now extinct, Suni antelope (Neotragus moschatus), elephants (Loxodonta africana), giraffes (Giraffa camelopardalis), black-and-white colobus monkeys (Colobus guereza), and grey parrots (Psittacus erithacus) confiscated from illegal trade.

Common native fauna include the vervet monkey (Chlorocebus aethiops), sitatunga (Tragelaphus spekei), hippopotamus, genet and bushbuck (Tragelaphus scriptus).

In October 2021, Prime Minister, Kassim Majaliwa visited the park and ordered TANAPA to cooperate with tourism stakeholders, for the marketing of the Rubondo Island to maximise the numbers of tourist in Geita region.

Transport 

Rubondo Island can be reached by park boat from two different locations. One option is the boat from Kasenda, a small village near Muganza in Chato District. The other option is the boat from Nkome in Geita District.
By airplane, Rubondo Airstrip can be reached with Auric Air or Coastal Aviation.

Accommodation on the island includes the beautiful park bandas which are located close to the HQ office. The price to stay in these beautiful bandas (chalet) overlooking the waters of Lake Victoria is $45 per night self-catering.

References 

The Chimpanzees of Rubondo Island Apes Set Free by Josephine N Msindai and Volker Sommer

Population history of chimpanzees introduced to Lake Victoria’s Rubondo Island

External links 
  Tanzania National Parks:  official Rubondo Island National Park website (archived)
 Tanzania National Parks
 Tanzania Tourist Board
 Tanzania Tourism online.com

National parks of Tanzania
Lake islands of Tanzania
Lake Victoria
Geography of Mwanza Region
Miombo
Protected areas established in 1965
1965 establishments in Tanzania
Tourist attractions in the Mwanza Region
Important Bird Areas of Tanzania
Central Zambezian miombo woodlands